{{Infobox character
| color              = #bfdfff
| name               = Al Powell
| image              = 
| image_size         = 
| caption            = Reginald VelJohnson as Sgt Al Powell in Die Hard'
| alias              = 
| position           = 
| occupation         = Police Officer
| gender             = Male
| title              = Desk Sergeant at the Los Angeles Police Department
| family             = Unnamed wifeMichael Tucker (cousin)
| children           = Unnamed son
| nickname           = "Pal"
| nationality        = American
}}

Sergeant Al Powell is a fictional character from the 1988 action film Die Hard, portrayed by Reginald VelJohnson. Powell is an off-duty police officer who gets called into work to investigate a potential hostage situation at Nakatomi Plaza. Powell then becomes a central character in the conflict, and a source of moral support for protagonist John McClane.

Fictional character biography

Investigation of Nakatomi Plaza

The audience is introduced to Powell while he is on his way home from work. Powell made a stop at a nearby service station to grab Twinkies for his pregnant wife. While at the station, Powell was radioed in from his work to investigate an apparent emergency at Nakatomi Plaza. Powell investigated the lobby of the building and was led to believe that the alarm was tripped due to a bug in the building's computer system. As Powell re-entered his car and began to radio that there was no emergency at Nakatomi Plaza, John McClane threw the body of one of the terrorists he had killed onto the roof of Powell's car. After the body landed, the remaining terrorists began opening fire at the car, riddling it with bullets and causing it to crash nearby. Powell called in for assistance from his supervisor, Deputy Chief Dwayne T. Robinson. Powell eventually came into contact with McClane over the radio, knowing him only as "Roy". Powell would inform McClane of the LAPD's strategies and would provide encouragement and comfort for McClane during the siege. Powell eventually reveals to McClane that he was given a desk job after he accidentally shot and killed a child holding a toy gun. Powell became unable to cope with the incident and refused to fire his weapon again. McClane eventually saves his wife, Holly, from the clutches of the German terrorist, Hans Gruber, ending the event. Outside the building, McClane and Powell finally meet for the first time face-to-face. The encounter is briefly interrupted by Gruber's henchmen Karl Vreski – who was believed dead – emerging from the building with a Steyr AUG still swearing vengeance on McClane for the death of his brother Tony. Vreski is shot dead by Powell once Vreski aims his weapon at McClane, ending the reign of the terrorists and restoring Powell's courage after his incident. Powell opens the door to Argyle's limousine for McClane and Holly to drive off together.

Post-Nakatomi

At some point between the events of Die Hard and Die Hard 2, McClane moved from New York to Los Angeles with Holly, and he and Powell became co-workers and close friends. During the events of the film, McClane had gone to Washington D.C. to celebrate Christmas with his in-laws, and was waiting at Washington Dulles International Airport for Holly's flight from Los Angeles to arrive. While waiting, McClane came across a pair of armed criminals breaking into the baggage handling area. McClane was forced to kill one of the suspects in self-defense. Due to the unprofessionalism of the airport's police chief, Carmine Lorenzo, McClane was forced to grab an improvised set of fingerprints from the deceased suspect and fax them to Powell in Los Angeles for identification. Powell identifies the suspect as Sergeant Oswald Cochran, who was believed killed in action in a helicopter accident in Honduras two years prior. Powell faxes the dossier to McClane in Dulles and the two say their goodbyes.

Production

The character of Powell in Die Hard was the breakout performance for actor Reginald VelJohnson, who had previously only had small roles in films such as Ghostbusters and Crocodile Dundee. The role helped VelJohnson to gain the role of Carl Winslow on the television sitcom Family Matters, where he would again portray a police officer. Despite only appearing in two scenes during Die Hard 2, VelJohnson still received fourth billing, behind other returning actors Bonnie Bedelia and William Atherton from the first film. Before VelJohnson was cast, actor Wesley Snipes had auditioned for the part. Gene Hackman had also been considered for the part according to VelJohnson, but was unable to take the role.. 22 Aug 1988.

Potential return

It had been speculated that Powell would return in a potential sixth film in the franchise, tentatively called McClane. It had been rumored that VelJohnson would reprise his role in the film, and would appear alongside Bruce Willis as McClane, and potentially Samuel L. Jackson reprising his role as Zeus Carver from Die Hard With a Vengeance. However, the project has currently been cancelled outright due to Disney’s acquisition of Fox, and is now planned to be rebooted as a potential streaming service show.

Reception

VelJohnson's portrayal of Powell in the first Die Hard was met with much acclaim from fans. Powell has gone on to become one of the most recognisable characters from the franchise, along with John McClane and Hans Gruber. The dynamic between VelJohnson and Bruce Willis in the film was another source for critical acclaim, with many critics citing Powell as the moral center of the film, and with many considering him to be something of McClane's sidekick. Powell's character arc and development throughout the first film was also seen by many as a highlight of the film, signifying living with a mistake and grief. Powell eventually overcoming his guilt to save McClane and Holly at the end of the film from Karl Vreski was seen as a perfect ending to the character's arc.

Legacy

Due to the popularity of his role in Die Hard, VelJohnson gained the role of Carl Winslow on the television sitcom Family Matters. VelJohnson would also appear in television show Chuck reprising his role as Powell in the episode Chuck Versus Santa Claus. VelJohnson would also appear as himself in the television show Brooklyn Nine-Nine, which often references and pays tribute to Die Hard as it is main character Jake Peralta's favourite film. VelJohnson appears in the episode "Bachelor/ette Party" in the show's fifth season during Jake Peralta's bachelor party. VelJohnson is intended to be a part of a scavenger hunt set up by Peralta's best friend, Charles Boyle. However, Peralta and the other attendees, Terry Jeffords and Captain Raymond Holt, ditch the scavenger hunt. Eventually Boyle finds out about the deception and leaves upset. This leads the group to VelJohnson's apartment, where Peralta attempts to apologise to him, where VelJohnson retorts at Peralta and states that he has made an enemy for life, and intends to tell Peralta's idol and VelJohnson's Die Hard co-star Bruce Willis that he sucks. Powell remains one of VelJohnson's favourite and most iconic roles, alongside Carl Winslow from Family Matters. Due to the character's apparent fascination with Twinkies, VelJohnson has commented that many fans give him Twinkies when they meet him. The character's lack of involvement in Die Hard 2'' disappointed fans of the character, who had wished to have seen the character in more than two scenes. The character's absence from the franchise's later instalments has garnered a degree of backlash from fans, who have wished to see the character return in some capacity. Movie critic Chris Stuckmann stated in his review of the film, "I wish there was more Powell in it too, I want more Reginald VelJohnson. I understand that [McClane] is at an airport in a different place."

References

Die Hard
Fictional police officers in films
Film characters introduced in 1979
Action film characters
Fictional police sergeants
Fictional characters from California
Film sidekicks
Fictional African-American people